Charles Coon (June 2, 1931 – January 18, 2003) was an American bridge player.
He finished second in two world championships and won six North American Bridge Championships (NABC).

A son of Carleton Coon, Coon was from Gloucester, Massachusetts. He graduated from Harvard College and served in the Korean War. Then he "devoted himself to playing bridge" but "[u]nlike other top players, he spent nearly all his time playing for money in clubs and earning himself a modest income." He was manager of the Boston Chess Club as of March 1961. He died in Staten Island at age 71 in 2003.

Coon's first "national"-level victory in the American Contract Bridge League was his greatest. He was one of "four young bridge experts led by Robert F. Jordan" who won the annual Vanderbilt Cup in 1961, when it was contested in a 64- double-elimination tournament. Jordan played with Arthur Robinson, also of Philadelphia, and Coon played with Eric Murray of Toronto. Coon–Murray went on to qualify for the 6-man North America team in the 1962 Bermuda Bowl where they finished second to Italy's Blue Team.

Bridge accomplishments

Awards

 Herman Trophy (1) 1966

Wins

 North American Bridge Championships (6)
 Leventritt Silver Ribbon Pairs (1) 2000 
 Wernher Open Pairs (1) 1989 
 Blue Ribbon Pairs (1) 1966 
 Nail Life Master Open Pairs (1) 1964 
 Vanderbilt (1) 1961 
 Chicago Mixed Board-a-Match (1) 1962

Runners-up

 Bermuda Bowl (1) 1962 
 Rosenblum Cup (1) 1990 
 North American Bridge Championships (3)
 Mitchell Board-a-Match Teams (2) 1964, 1968 
 Reisinger (1) 1961

References

External links
 

1931 births
2003 deaths
American contract bridge players
Bermuda Bowl players
Sportspeople from Gloucester, Massachusetts
Harvard College alumni